Leucochrysum is a genus of flowering plants in the tribe Gnaphalieae within the family Asteraceae, endemic to Australia.

 Species
 Leucochrysum albicans (A.Cunn.) Paul G.Wilson
 Leucochrysum alpinum (F.Muell.) R.J.Dennis & N.G.Walsh
 Leucochrysum fitzgibbonii (F.Muell.) Paul G.Wilson
 Leucochrysum graminifolium (Paul G.Wilson) Paul G.Wilson
 Leucochrysum molle (A.Cunn. ex DC.) Paul G.Wilson
 Leucochrysum stipitatum (F.Muell.) Paul G.Wilson

References

Asteraceae genera
Gnaphalieae
Endemic flora of Australia
Taxa named by Paul G. Wilson